Artificial intuition is a theoretical capacity of an artificial software to function similarly to human consciousness, specifically in the capacity of human consciousness known as intuition.

Comparison of human and the theoretically artificial 
Intuition is the function of the mind, the experience of which, is described as knowledge based on "a hunch", resulting (as the word itself does) from "contemplation" or "insight".

Psychologist Jean Piaget showed that intuitive functioning within the normally developing human child at the Intuitive Thought Substage  of the preoperational stage occurred at from four to seven years of age. In Carl Jung's concept of synchronicity, the concept of "intuitive intelligence" is described as something like a capacity that transcends ordinary-level functioning to a point where information is understood with a greater depth than is available in more simple rationally-thinking entities.

Artificial intuition is theoretically (or otherwise) a sophisticated function of an artifice that is able to interpret data with depth and locate hidden factors functioning in  Gestalt psychology, and that intuition in the artificial mind would, in the context described here, be a bottom-up process upon a macroscopic scale identifying something like the archetypal (see τύπος).

To create artificial intuition supposes the possibility of the re-creation of a higher functioning of the human mind, with capabilities such as what might be found in semantic memory and learning. The transferral of the functioning of a biological system to synthetic functioning is based upon modeling of functioning from knowledge of cognition and  the brain, for instance as applications of models of artificial neural networks from the research done within the discipline of computational neuroscience.

Application software contributing to its development
The notion of a process of a data-interpretative synthesis has already been found in a computational-linguistic software application that has been created for use in an internal security context.  The software integrates computed data based specifically on objectives  incorporating a paradigm described as "religious intuitive" (hermeneutic), functional to a degree that represents advances upon the performance of generic lexical data mining.

In fiction
Artificial intelligence in fiction often crosses the line to apparent artificial intuition, although it can't be shown if the intent of the fiction creator was to show a simulation of intuition or that real artificial intuition is part of the story's AI, because this depends on the internal structure of the programming of the AI, which is not usually shown in stories.

 The Terminator, (James Cameron, Gale Anne Hurd, William Wisher, Jr.) – in The Terminator, it's unclear whether the machines had a form of intuition or that all their processes were programmed.  
 Star trek, (written by Gene Roddenberry)– Data is a humanoid who shows artificial intelligence, but it can't be shown he is showing artificial intuition, since his programming is not disclosed. 
 Blade Runner – (P.K. Dick) (Hampton Fancher & David Peoples) if Roy and other replicants were actually "replicas" of humans, then they undoubtedly must have had intuition. However, it's not clear what type of brain the replicants had, and if these were 100% similar to human brains.

See also

Artificial creativity
Artificial imagination
Artificial intelligence
Concept-mapping and  mind-mapping
Connectionism
Cybernetics
Dreyfus's criticism of A.I.
Information theory
Intuitionistic logic
Intuition (philosophy)
List of concept- and mind-mapping software
Natural language processing
Panayiotis Zavos
Usability

References

Bibliography
The Oxford Companion to Philosophy - E. Honderich  (Oxford University Press, 1995)

External links 
 image/drawing showing meta-map 19:49(GMT)
  Academia © 2011  retrieved 19:38(GMT)  25.10.2011 (People who have Artificial Intuition as a research subject)
  transcript of conversation (2) retrieved 19:57(UTC) 26.10.2011 (a discussion held within The Intuition Network website showing a discussion between John McCarthy (primarily credited amongst others with introducing the idea of artificial intelligence (Dartmouth workshop) and J.Mishlove.

Applications of artificial intelligence